De Laurentiis Entertainment Group (DEG) was an entertainment production company and distribution studio founded by Italian producer Dino De Laurentiis. The company is notable for producing Manhunter, Blue Velvet, the horror films Near Dark and Evil Dead II, King Kong Lives (the sequel to De Laurentiis' remake of King Kong), and Bill & Ted's Excellent Adventure, as well as distributing The Transformers: The Movie.

The company's main studios were located in Wilmington, North Carolina, which is now EUE/Screen Gems Studios. The studio's first releases were in 1986. It went bankrupt two years later after Million Dollar Mystery, among other films, failed at the box office. Carolco Pictures acquired DEG in 1989.

History
In 1983, Dino De Laurentiis produced Firestarter in Wilmington. The governor of North Carolina, Jim Hunt, claimed that the filming increased economic activity in the state. Hunt used incentives and loans to allow De Laurentiis to buy a local warehouse to convert into a studio. In early 1984, De Laurentiis founded the North Carolina Film Corporation, with Martha Schumacher as president.

In 1985, DEG acquired Embassy Pictures from The Coca-Cola Company, allowing for North American distribution of De Laurentiis' new product. Dino De Laurentiis continued to pre-sell his films for overseas distribution, as he had done in the past. In May 1986, De Laurentiis took DEG public, raising $240 million in the process. The following month, DEG's first slate of films were released. In 1986, De Laurentiis formed an Australian subsidiary, De Laurentiis Entertainment Limited (DEL), which built a studio on the Gold Coast. Although De Laurentiis asserted that the company would make films on par with the major studios, most of DEG's slate consisted of films budgeted at $10 million or less, below the industry standard of $14–16 million, with the notable exceptions of King Kong Lives and Tai-Pan, the only studio-level films DEG financed. Also that year, DEG entered into a strategic partnership with producers Fred Silverman and Gordon Farr to launch the syndicated strip Honeymoon Hotel, with a promise to run it for 100 episodes, and a new starring vehicle for Isabel Sanford. Later that year, DEG also financed another syndicated strip with Silverman and Farr to set up California Girls, with Viacom Enterprises serving as distributor of the series.

By August 1987, DEG was $16.5 million in debt, citing the box-office failures and/or disappointments of its product. Dino De Laurentiis refused offers to sell the company because he wanted to retain controlling interest. Around the same time, De Laurentiis' daughter Raffaella exited her role as DEG's president of production.

De Laurentiis' North Carolina studio would be sold by Carolco Pictures and the Gold Coast studio would be acquired by Village Roadshow.

The De Laurentiis library is currently owned by StudioCanal via its acquisition of the Paravision International library; with some exceptions. Films that were distributed by United Artists are now owned by Amazon, via Metro-Goldwyn-Mayer, while films by HBO Pictures are owned by Warner Bros. Discovery. North American home video rights to much of their films are split between MGM Home Entertainment (for the Embassy library via PolyGram) and Lionsgate Films (for the rest). My Little Pony: The Movie and The Transformers: The Movie are now owned by Hasbro after obtaining the rights from Sunbow Entertainment (along with all other animated series based on Hasbro properties).

Films released

Canadian distribution of DEG releases were done by Paramount Pictures.

DEG had an early version of Total Recall in pre-production with Patrick Swayze as Quaid and Bruce Beresford to direct (David Cronenberg had also been approached), where it was to have been shot in Australia. After DEG's bankruptcy, the film went in turnaround to Carolco Pictures.

Along with the Embassy Pictures library, De Laurentiis Entertainment Group's library was sold to Paravision, a subsidiary of L'Oréal, in 1989. The library was later sold to Canal+ and is currently held by StudioCanal.

References

American companies established in 1984
American companies disestablished in 1989
Entertainment companies established in 1984
Mass media companies established in 1984
Mass media companies disestablished in 1989
Film production companies of the United States
Film distributors of the United States
Defunct American film studios
Companies based in Wilmington, North Carolina
1984 establishments in North Carolina
1989 disestablishments in North Carolina